Tahrir Square (Arabic: , , lit: Liberation Square) is a major public town square in downtown Cairo, Egypt.

Tahrir Square may also refer to:

 Tahrir Square, Alexandria, Egypt
 Tahrir Square, Baghdad, Iraq
 Tahrir Square, Damascus, Syria; on Baghdad Street
 Tahrir Square, Sanaa, Yemen

See also
 Liberation Square (disambiguation)